Wights Mountain is a rural locality in the Moreton Bay Region, Queensland, Australia.

Geography

History 
The locality was named after selector George Wight who settled in the area in the late 1860s.

Samford Valley Steiner School opened on 18 February 1987.

The median age of the Wights Mountain population was 41 years, 4 years above the national median of 37.  75.2% of people living in Wights Mountain were born in Australia. The other top responses for country of birth were England 8.6%, New Zealand 2.5%, Canada 1.2%, United States of America 1.1%, Switzerland 1.1%.  93.5% of people spoke only English at home; the next most common languages were 1.8% German, 0.6% Hindi, 0.4% French, 0.4% Cantonese, 0.4% Italian.

Education 
Samford Valley Steiner School is a private primary and secondary (Prep-12) school for boys and girls at Narrawa Drive. In 2017, the school had an enrolment of 339 students with 29 teachers (26 full-time equivalent) and 29 non-teaching staff (21 full-time equivalent).

Amenities 
There are a number of parks in the locality:

 Bora Park
 Harold Brown Park

 Hope River Park

 Small Park

References

Suburbs of Moreton Bay Region
Localities in Queensland